"Cheapskate (You Ain't Gettin' Nada)" is the first single released from the Sporty Thievz debut album, Street Cinema. Produced by Ski, the song's lyrics are similar to that of their follow-up smash hit, "No Pigeons", with the song making reference to the fact that the members are not willing to buy expensive materials for any women. The original made it to both the R&B and rap charts.

A remix entitled "Even Cheaper" was also released as a single. It was also produced by Ski and featured verses from female rappers, Liz Leite and Mocha Latte. It also made it to the Billboard charts, peaking at 27 on the Hot Rap Singles.

Single track listing

A-Side
"Cheapskate" (L.P. Version)- 3:50  
"Cheapskate" (Clean Version)- 3:52  
"Cheapskate" (Instrumental)- 3:52

B-Side
"Raw Footage" (L.P. Version)- 4:59  
"Raw Footage" (Clean Version)- 4:59  
"Raw Footage" (instrumental)- 4:59

Charts
Cheapskate (You Ain't Gettin' Nada)

Even Cheaper

1998 songs
1998 debut singles
Sporty Thievz songs